Teracotona submaculata is a moth in the family Erebidae. It was described by Francis Walker in 1855. It is found in Kenya, Malawi, Namibia, Somalia and South Africa.

References

Moths described in 1855
Spilosomina